Massena is a town in St. Lawrence County, New York, United States. Massena is along the county's northern border, just south of the St. Lawrence River and the Three Nations Crossing of the Canada–United States border. The population was 12,883 at the 2010 census. The town of Massena contains a village also named Massena.

History  

Massena was one of the first towns settled in St. Lawrence county, but was not incorporated until 1802 when it was formed from the town of Lisbon. The town and its village are named after André Masséna, a general and Marshal to Napoleon during the Napoleonic Wars.

The town suffered natural disasters in the 1944 Cornwall-Massena earthquake and in the January 1998 North American ice storm.  In 1928 it was the scene of the antisemitic Massena blood libel.

Economy 
Up until the 1880s, the town was predominantly agricultural, mainly home to butter and cheese production.  Aside from the dairy farmers (and the blacksmiths, craftsmen, and shopkeepers who served them), the town boasted the Massena Springs, a pair of sulfur springs, one hot and the other cold, reputed to possess healing powers known to the Native Americans before European settlement. In 1820, an Army veteran, Captain John Polley, hoping to capitalize on the properties, opened a hotel and began to advertise them. By 1858, three hotels, numerous rental cottages, a bathing house, and a plant that bottled and sold the spring water, had been built. By about 1900, the Springs' status as a popular resort had faded.

The first small mills were built in the 1830s, harnessing the Grasse River to turn their wheels. They included a saw mill, stone-cutter, and a tannery. In 1833, New York State Legislature approved a canal that would bypass a troublesome rapids hindering navigation on the St. Lawrence by linking the Grasse and St. Lawrence Rivers. However, the British North American government preempted this project by building the Cornwall Canal on the Canadian side of the River, completed in 1843. The Massena Canal project was revived at the end of the century and completed in 1898.

The modern town's economy is centered on power production, the commerce of the St. Lawrence Seaway, and an Alcoa Aluminum plant, the world's longest continually operating aluminum facility.  Alcoa employs over 600 people at its facilities in Massena. Massena's economy has suffered for the past few decades due to the decline of American manufacturing and the automotive industry. 

The Massena Power Canal (closed in 1958) connected the lower Grass River to the St. Lawrence River. A powerhouse built in the early 1900s provided hydroelectric power to the town. The New York Power Authority now operates a hydroelectric power generating dam, the St. Lawrence-FDR Power Project, on the St. Lawrence River adjacent to Massena. Curran Renewable Energy manufactures wood pellet fuel and mulch in the town.

Massena is also home to the Eisenhower and Snell Locks, part of the St. Lawrence Seaway which allows ships and vessels to pass through the St. Lawrence River and on to the Great Lakes.

While on November 2, 2015, Alcoa announced the idling of the smelter at its "Alcoa West" plant, the facility remained open through negotiations with New York State, and 400 jobs were saved until 2019. The Forgings and Extrusions facilities at Alcoa West were unaffected. The changes resulted in the loss of 487 jobs.

It was estimated in 2013 that nearly 30% of Massena residents live below the poverty line. St. Lawrence County's poverty rate is higher than both the state and federal rates and ranks the 5th highest in New York State.

Demographics

By 2012 industrial employment had declined and there were 10,357 people in the town, down from 16,021 in 1970.

As of the census of 2000, there were 13,121 people, 2,510 households, and 3,454 families residing in the town. The town's racial makeup was 96.80% White, 0.30% Black or African American, 1.25% Native American, 0.41% Asian, 0.03% Pacific Islander, 0.18% from other races, and .02% from two or more races. Hispanic or Latino of any race were 0.83% of the population.

There were 5,510 households, of which 39.4% had children under the age of 18 living with them, 36.1% were married couples living together, 12.2% had a female householder with no husband present, and 37.3% were non-families. 31.1% of all households were made up of individuals, and 13.9% had someone living alone who was 65 years of age or older. The average household size was 2.98 and the average family size was 3.67.

In the town, the population was spread out, with 23.7% under the age of 18, 7.1% from 18 to 24, 27.3% from 25 to 44, 23.2% from 45 to 64, and 18.8% who were 65 years of age or older. The median age was 36 years. For every 100 females, there were 88.6 males. For every 100 females age 18 and over, there were 84.7 males.

The town's median household income was $58,391, and the median family income was $62,696. Males had a median income of $48,484 versus $46,819 for females. The per capita income was $25,111. About 6.9% of families and 8.9% of the population were below the poverty line, including 15.4% of those under age 18 and 1.8% of those age 65 or over.

Communities and locations in Massena 
 Barnhardt Island – An island in the St. Lawrence River northeast of Massena village. The island is at the international border and is the northernmost point of land in New York. 
 Long Sault Island ("Isle au Long Saut") – An island in the St. Lawrence River north of Massena village. 
 Massena – A village at the western town line on both banks of the Grasse River. 
 Massena Center – A hamlet northeast of Massena village. 
 Massena Power Canal – A waterway connecting the Grasse River to the St. Lawrence River. 
 Massena Springs – A hamlet south of Massena village by the Raquette River. The community was the site of health resorts and hotels based on sulphurous spring water. 
 Raquette River – A hamlet east of Massena village by the Raquette River. It was first settled circa 1804.
 Robert Moses State Park – A state park in the northern part of the town. 
 Rooseveltown – A hamlet near the eastern town line by the Raquette River. 
 Wiley Dondero Canal – A waterway constructed as part of the St. Lawrence power project.

Education
Both the village and town of Massena are served by the Massena Central School District, which also serves most of Louisville, a portion of Norfolk and Brasher, and the St. Regis Mohawk Reservation.
Jefferson Elementary School (K-6)
Madison Elementary School (K-6)
Nightengale Elementary School (K-6)
J. William Leary Junior High School (7-8)
Massena Central High School (9-12)
Trinity Catholic School (K-6)
Holy Name of Jesus Academy (K-12)

Transportation
New York State Route 37, a northeast–southwest highway, passes along the outskirts of the town. The town is served by Massena International Airport, east of Massena village, south of NY-37. Trailways of New York provides bus service from Massena to Syracuse. The town had until 1961 been the terminus for New York Central Railroad (NYC) sleeping car passenger service on its St. Lawrence Division; the last sleepers came in from the NYC's Iroquois and the outgoing sleeper fed into the New York Special. The final run of regular local trains into the town was in 1964.

Radio
 1340 WMSA 
 WVLF-FM Mix 96.1
 WRCD-FM 101.5 The Fox
 WYBG – AM 1050 (defunct as of June 30, 2015)

In popular culture
Massena was a location featured in Me, Myself & Irene, released in 2000, starring Jim Carrey and Renée Zellweger.

Massena was a location featured in the film Frozen River.

For Ellen, released in 2012, was filmed in Massena and the surrounding area.

Notable people

 Avery D. Andrews, brigadier general in the United States Army
 William G. Bissell, Wisconsin State Senator, merchant, salesman and farmer, was born in Massena.
 Stephanie Bissonnette, dancer and choreographer known for her role in the original Broadway production of the musical “Mean Girls"
 Aaron Bogosian, Former American Hockey League player
 Zach Bogosian, National Hockey League player on the Tampa Bay Lightning
 Gary Danko, chef
 Timothy Fay, Lieutenant General, United States Air Force
 Jim Deshaies, former Major League Baseball player, television color analyst.
 Follett Johnson, Medal of Honor recipient
 Mike Hurlbut, retired professional hockey player, collegiate ice hockey coach
 Bid McPhee, former Major League Baseball player and member of the Baseball Hall of Fame
 Horace N. Polley, Wisconsin State Assemblyman and farmer, was born in Massena.
 Myron Reed, Wisconsin State Senator and lawyer, was born in Massena.
 Hal Smith, actor

See also
 Andre Massena, Napoleonic general. 
 Massena, Iowa, another community, named after Massena, NY

References

External links 
 Early Massena history—Rays-Place.com
 Massena information—NorthCountryNow.com
 mymassena.com—Massena Local Online Community
  Massena Historic Map
 Photo of Massena depot of the New York Central

Populated places established in 1802
New York (state) populated places on the Saint Lawrence River
Towns in St. Lawrence County, New York
1802 establishments in New York (state)